The Victoria Makerspace is a biology community lab, founded by Derek Jacoby and Thomas Gray in 2010, and was one of the first do-it-yourself biology labs, following the establishment of BioCurious and Genspace in the US. The lab has taken part in the FBI DIY biology summit in Walnut Creek, California in 2012, the first Canadian DIY Biology Summit in 2016, and the iGEM synthetic biology competition in 2014 with a project on preventing dental decay.

References

Further reading

External links
 Official website
 Victoria Makerspace on Hackerspaces.org

Canadian companies established in 2010
Companies based in Victoria, British Columbia
Business incubators of Canada
Technology companies established in 2010